This is a list of breakfast cereals. Many cereals are trademarked brands of large companies, such as Kellogg's, General Mills, Malt-O-Meal, Nestlé, Quaker Oats and Post Foods, but similar equivalent products are often sold by other manufacturers and as store brands.

A

All-Bran – Kellogg's (1916–present)
Almond Delight – Ralston
Alpen – Weetabix Limited
 Alpen No Sugar – Weetabix Limited
Alpha-Bits – Post Cereals (1958–2021)
Apple Jacks – Kellogg's (1965–present)
Apple DJ Crashers – Kellogg's (2007)
Apple Jacks Apple Clones – Kellogg's (2010–present)
Caramel Apple Jacks – Kellogg's (2020)
Cinnamon Jacks – Kellogg's (2013)
CinnaScary Apple Jacks – Kellogg's (2005)
Apple Jacks Double Vision – Kellogg's (2006)
Apple Jacks with Blue Carrots – Kellogg's (2003)
Apple Jacks Gliders – Kellogg's (2009)
Apple Jacks with Marshmallows – Kellogg's
Apple Raisin Crisp – Kellogg's
Apple Zings – Malt-O-Meal Company
Aquaman – Funko
Atlantis: The Lost Empire – Kellogg's (2001)
Autumn O's – Kellogg's (1997–present)
Avengers – Kellogg's

B

 Baby Shark Cereal – Kellogg's (2019–present)
Bart Simpson's No ProblemO's – Kellogg's (2002)
Bart Simpson's Eat My Shorts – Kellogg's (2003)
Bart Simpson Peanut Butter Chocolate Crunch – Kellogg's (2001)
 Basic 4 – General Mills
Batman – Ralcorp
Batman – Funko
Batman – General Mills
Batman Returns – Ralcorp
 Boo Berry – General Mills (1973–present / seasonal since 2010)
Black Panther – FYE
 Blueberry Muffin Toasters – Malt-O-Meal (2019)
 Bob Ross The Joy of Cereal – FYE (2019–present)
 Booty O's – FYE (2016)
 Bran Flakes
Crownfield – Lidl
Harvest Morn – Aldi
Kellogg's (1922–present)
 Brekky Things
 Choc Boulders
 Fruity Hoops
 Honey Bolts
 Choc Malt Clusters
 Berry Loops
 Buc Wheats – General Mills (discontinued)
 Buzz Blasts – Disney/Pixar/Kellogg's (2002–2005/06)

C

C-3PO's – based on the Star Wars character C-3PO (1990)
Cabbage Patch Kids Cereal (1980s)
The California Raisins Cereal – Post Cereals
Cap'n Crunch – Quaker Oats (1963–present) originally named after state football champ captain Lance (Crunch) Rickman
Cap'n Crunch Crunch Berries – Quaker Oats (1980–present)
 Choco Crunch
 Choco Donuts – (2003–?)
 Chocolatey Crunch
 Chocolatey Berry Crunch – (2020–?)
 Cinnamon Crunch – (1973–1974)
 Cinnamon Roll Crunch – (2012–present?)
 Deep Sea Crunch
 Home Run Crunch – (1995–1996, 2007–2008 (rerelease), 2016 (second rerelease))
 Peanut Butter Crunch – Quaker Oats (1969)
 Punch Crunch – Quaker Oats (1973)
 Sprinkled Donut Crunch – (2015?-?)
 Touchdown Crunch – (2019)
 Not Vanilly Crunch – Quaker Oats (1971)
Captain Planet Cereal (1994)
 Caramel Crunchfuls – (2010–present)
Cars (movie) – Kellogg's (2006)
Cars 2 – Kellogg's (2011)
Cars 3 – Kellogg's (2017)
The Cat in the Hat – Kellogg's (2003)
 Caticorn – Kellogg's
 Cheerios – General Mills (1941–present)
 Ancient Grain Cheerios (2015)
Apple Cinnamon Cheerios (1988–present)
Banana Nut Cheerios (2008–present)
 Berry Burst Cheerios (2003–present)
 Berry Burst Cheerios – Strawberry (2003–present)
 Berry Burst Cheerios – Triple Berry (2003–present)
 Cheerios Protein – Cheerios (2014)
 Cinnamon Cheerios (2004–present)
Cinnamon Burst Cheerios (2011–present)
Cinnamon Nut Cheerios (1980–present)
 Chocolate Cheerios (2010–present)
 Chocolate Peanut Butter Cheerios (Limited edition for 2016, permanent in 2017)
 Frosted Cheerios (1995–present)
 Fruity Cheerios (2006–present)
Honey Nut Cheerios (1979–present)
Maple Cheerios
 Millenios (Cheerios) (1999–2000)
MultiGrain Cheerios (1991–present)
MultiGrain Dark Chocolate Crunch Cheerios (2014–present)
MultiGrain Peanut Butter Crunch Cheerios (2012–2018)
Oat Cluster Cheerios Crunch (2007–present)
 Pumpkin Spice Cheerios (2016)
 Strawberry Cheerios (2017)
 Team (USA) Cheerios (1996) – (special edition, discontinued)
 Toasted Coconut Cheerios (2019)
 Very Berry Cheerios (2017–present)
Yogurt Burst Cheerios – Strawberry (2004–present)
Yogurt Burst Cheerios – Vanilla (2004–present)
Chex – Ralcorp (1937–1997); General Mills (1997–present)
Apple Cinnamon Chex (2012–present)
Chocolate Chex (2007–present)
Cinnamon Chex (2009–present)
Corn Chex (1958–present)
Double Chex (1990s)
Frosted Mini-Chex (2002–2006)
Graham Chex (mid 1990s)
Honey Graham Chex (1986–early 1990s)
Honey Nut Chex (1999–present)
Multi-Bran Chex (1990–present)
Peanut Butter Chex
Rice Chex (1950–present)
Strawberry Chex (2008–2010)
Sugar Chex (1970s)
Vanilla Chex (2013–present)
Wheat Chex (1937–present)
Choco Crunch (original) – Quaker Oats (1980s)
Choco Crunch (re-introduced version) – Quaker Oats (2007–present)
Chocapic – Nestlé
Chocolate Donutz – General Mills (early 1980s)
 Chocolate Crunchfuls (2010–present)
Chocolate Flakes – Kellogg's (not generally sold in the U.S.)
 Chocolate Peanut Butter Corn Pops – Kellogg's – (2007)
Chrebet Crunch (1999)
Chocolatey Peanut Butter Crunch – Quaker Oats (2006)
Chocolate Toast Crunch – General Mills (2013–present)
Chocos – Kellogg's
Christmas Crunch – Quaker Oats (1988–present)
Cinnabon – Kellogg's
Cinnamon Crunch – Quaker Oats (1970s)
Cinnamon Crunch Crispix – Kellogg's (2001–2006)
Cinnamon Grahams – United Kingdom
Cinnamon Jacks – Kellogg's (2013–)
Cinnamon Mini-Buns (1991–1993)
Cinnamon Marshmallow Scooby-Doo – Kellogg's (2002)
Cinnamon Toast Crunch – General Mills (1984–present)
Cinnamon Toast Crunch Churros – General Mills (2018)
Cinnamon Toasters – Malt-O-Meal
 Circus Fun – General Mills (Late 1980s)
 Clackers – General Mills
Clusters – General Mills
Coco Munch
Coco Roos – Malt-O-Meal
CoCo Wheats – Little Crow Foods (1930–present)
Coco Pops – Kellogg's (known as Cocoa Krispies in some parts of the world; the generic equivalent sold under many different names)
Cocoa Pebbles – Post Cereals
Cocoa Puffs – General Mills (1958–present)
Cocoa Puffs Brownie Crunch (2011)
Cocoa Puffs Combos (vanilla and chocolate puffs mixed) – General Mills (2008)
 Cocoa Hoots – Kellogg's
Colossal Crunch – Malt-O-Meal
 Comet Balls – Spix/Sulava & Company (2006–present)
 Complete
 Concentrate – Kellogg's (1959–c.1980)
Cookie Crisp (1977–present)
Cookie Crisp Brownie (2013–present) (available in the U.K)
Double Chocolate Cookie Crisp (2006–2008)
Oatmeal Cookie Crisp (1978–1980)
Peanut Butter Cookie Crisp (2005–2007)
Cookie Crisp Sprinkles (2009–2012)
Vanilla Cookie Crisp (1978–mid 1980s)
 Corn Bran
 Corn Bran Squares
Corn Bursts – Malt-O-Meal
Corn Pops – Kellogg's (1951–present; originally known as Sugar Pops)
 3 Point Pops (1999)
 Candy Corn Pops (2001)
Corn Flakes
Harvest Morn – Aldi
Kellogg's (1907–present)
Tesco
 Corn Soya – Kellogg's
 Corny Snaps – Kellogg's (1970s)
Count Chocula (1971–present / seasonal since 2010)
Cracklin' Oat Bran Kellogg's
Cracker Jack Cereal – Ralston (1983–1985)
 Cranberry Almond Crunch – Post Cereals (1997–present)
 Cranberry Wheats – Asda
 Cran-Vanilla Crunch – Kellogg's (2005–2007)
Crazy Cow – General Mills (late 1970s)
Cream of Wheat (1893–present)
Create a Crunch Cereal Making Kit – Post Cereals (Early 2000s)
Crispix – Kellogg's – (1983–present)
Crispy Critters – Post Cereals (1963–1980s)
 Crispy Wheats 'n Raisins – (no longer in production)
Cröonchy Stars – Post Cereals (1988–1989) featuring the Muppets' Swedish Chef
Crunch Berries – Quaker Oats
Cruncheroos – Kellogg's (1990s)
 Crunchy Bran – Weetabix Limited
 Crunchy Corn Bran – Quaker Oats
Crunchy Nut Cornflakes – Kellogg's
Cuphead & Mugman – Funko

D
Despicable Me Cereal – Kellogg's (2017)
Diamond Shreddies – General Mills/Cereal Partners
Dinersaurs – Ralston (1988–1989)
 Dinky Donuts – Ralston (1980s)
 Donkey Kong Crunch – Ralston (1982–1983)
 Donkey Kong Jr. Cereal – Ralston (1983–1984)
 Dora the Explorer Cereal – General Mills
 Double Dip Crunch – Kellogg's (late 1980s–1993)
Dudley Do-Right – General Mills
Dunkin' Donuts Cereal – Ralston (late 1980s)
Dunkin' Caramel Machiato (Post) 2020
Dunkin' Mocha Latte (Post) 2020
Dyno-Bites – Malt-O-Meal

E
Eggo – Kellogg's (2006–2012, 2019–present)
E.T. Cereal – Ralston (1984)
The Elf on the Shelf Cereal – Kellogg's – (2019)
Engine 2 (Rip's Big Bowl) – Whole Foods 
Elixir Cereals – Known by brand name Nutri-Crisp (2011–present)

F

The Fairly OddParents Cereal! – Post Cereals (2003–2004)
 Fantuz Flakes – Prepared for Federated Co-operatives Ltd, Collectors Edition for Saskatchewan Roughriders 100th season (2009–2010)
 Farley's Rusks Original
 Fiber One – General Mills
Finding Dory – Kellogg's (2016)
 Fingos – General Mills (1993 to 1994)
Five Nights at Freddy's – Funko
Five Nights at Freddy's – FYE
Fitness – Nestlé
Flutie Flakes – General Mills
 Football Crisp! – Nestlé (2006)
Force – (1901–1983 in the U.S.; 1902–present in the UK)
Fortified Oat Flakes – Post Cereals
Franken Berry (1971–present / seasonal since 2010)
Freakies – Ralston (1972–1976; reintroduced version 1987)
Cocoa Freakies – (1973–present)
Fruity Freakies – (1975–1976)
French Toast Crunch – General Mills (1995–2008, 2014–present)
Froot Loops – Kellogg's (1964–present)
Froots Loops Treasures Cereal – Kellogg's (2013–present)
Frosted Flakes – Kellogg's (known as Frosties in much of Europe; formerly known as Sugar Frosted Flakes (1952 – present)
Banana Frosted Flakes (1981–1984)
Birthday Confetti Frosted Flakes (1997)
Cocoa Frosted Flakes (1997–2000)
Less Sugar Frosted Flakes (2004–present) 
Frosted Flakes Gold (2008–present)
Frosted Flakes Chocolate (2011 & 2013) (marketed as Kombos in the 1970s)
Cinnamon Frosted Flakes (2016–present)
Honey Nut Frosted Flakes (2019–present)
Banana Creme Frosted Flakes (2019)
Frosted Flakes – Malt-O-Meal
Frosted Mini Spooners – Malt-O-Meal
Frosted Mini-Wheats (various flavors) – Kellogg's
Frosted Mini-Wheats Strawberry Delight
Bite Size Frosted Mini-Wheats with Brown Sugar
Bite Size Frosted Blueberry Muffin
Bite Size Frosted Cinnamon Streusel
Bite Size Frosted Chocolate
Bite Size Frosted Maple and Brown Sugar
Bite Size Frosted Strawberry Delight
Bite Size Frosted Vanilla Crème
Frosted Mini-Wheats Big Bite
Unfrosted Mini-Wheats
Little Bites Original
Little Bites Chocolate
Touch of Fruit in the Middle Mixed Berry
Frosted Shredded Wheat – see Shredded Wheat
Frosted Toast Crunch – General Mills (2012–present)
Frosties – see Frosted Flakes
Frosty O's – General Mills (1959-early 1980s) (eventually repackaged as "Frosted Cheerios")
Fruit & Bran – Post Cereals (discontinued)
Fruit & Nut Granola Cereal – Sunbelt
Fruit 'n Fibre
(including spelling variants) Kellogg's, others
 Fruit & Fibre (Crownfield) – Lidl
 Fruit & Fibre (Harvest Morn) – Aldi
 Fruit Harvest
 Fruit Islands – Ralston (1987)
 Fruit Wheats – Nabisco (1986)
 Fruity Dyno-bites – Malt-O-Meal
 Fruity Pebbles – Post Cereals
Funko’s
 Futurelife SmartFood

G

G.I. Joe Action Stars – Ralston (1985)
Ghostbusters Cereal – Ralston (1985–1988)
Ghostbusters II Cereal – Ralston (1989)
Ghostbusters: Afterlife Cereal – General Mills (2021)
 Go Lean Cereal (Crunch) – Kashi
Golden Crisp – Post Cereals (formerly known as Sugar Crisp, Super Sugar Crisp, and Super Golden Crisp; 1949–present)
Golden Goals – Quaker
Golden Grahams – General Mills (1970s–present)
Golden Nuggets – United Kingdom – Nestlé
Golden Oaties – Quaker (c.1982)
Golden Puffs – Malt-O-Meal
Good Friends Cereal (fiber cereal) – Kashi/Kellogg's
 Gorilla Munch – Nature's Path
 Gran Bits – Australia Hancock's Golden Crust Pty Ltd (1931-2001)
Granola
Granolove – honey roasted granola; Springfield, MO
 Kellogg's; 1900s
 Low Fat Granola Cereal – Sunbelt
Oatbox Cereal Co. – Cranberry, Rosemary & Raw Cocoa Nibs Granola (2014)
Oatbox Cereal Co. – Chai Tea & Roasted Pineapple Granola (2014)
Oatbox Cereal Co. – Old fashioned Apple Crumble Granola (2014)
Oatbox Cereal Co. – Pumpkin Spice Granola (2014)
Quaker 100% Natural Granola
 Specially Selected Very Berry Granola – Aldi
 W.K Kellogg No Added Sugar Simply Granola
Granula – first manufactured breakfast cereal, invented by James Caleb Jackson in 1863
Grape Nut Flakes – Post
Grape-Nuts – Post Cereals (1897–present)
Gremlins cereal – Ralston (1984)
 Grins & Smiles & Giggles & Laughs – Ralston (discontinued)
 Guardian Cinnamon with a hint of vanilla flavour – Canada – Kellogg's
 Guardian Original with a hint of maple flavour – Canada – Kelloggs

H

Halfsies – Quaker Oats (1980s)
Harvest Crunch – Quaker Oats 
Heart to Heart – Blueberry Oat Cluster Crunch – Kashi
Hershey's Cookies 'n' Creme Cereal – General Mills (2013–present)
 Hershey's Kisses Cereal
Hidden Treasures – General Mills (1993–1995)
High School Musical Cereal – Kellogg's/Disney (2008)
Homer's Cinnamon Donut Cereal – Kellogg's (c.2001)
Honey Bunches of Oats (1989–present)
Honey Bunches of Oats with Almonds (1990–present)
Honey Bunches of Oats with Apples with Cinnamon Bunches (2011–present)
Honey Bunches of Oats with Bananas (2004–2005)
Honey Bunches of Oats with Peaches (2004 – November 2011)
Honey Bunches of Oats with Strawberries (2002–present)
Honey Bunches of Oats with Chocolate Clusters (2008–present)
Honey Bunches of Oats with Cinnamon Clusters (2006–2012)
Honey Bunches of Oats with Vanilla Clusters (2007–present)
Honey Bunches of Oats Just Bunches (2008–present)
Honey Bunches of Oats Fruit Blends (2012–present)
Chicken & Waffles Honey Bunches of Oats – Post Cereals
Maple Bacon Donuts Honey Bunches of Oats – Post Cereals
Honey Bunny
Honey Buzzers – Malt-O-Meal
Honeycomb – Post Cereals (1965–present)
Honeycomb Strawberry
Honey Cups
 Honey-ful Wheat – Mom's Best Naturals
Honey Graham Oh's – Quaker Oats
Honey Graham Squares – Malt-O-Meal
 Honey Maid – Post Cereals (2007–2008)
Honey Nut Clusters – General Mills
Honey Crisps – Honeywell Cereals
Raisin Crisps – Honeywell Cereals
 Honey Nut Corn Flakes – Kellogg's (1981–present)
Honey Nut Shredded Wheat – Post
 Honey Nut Toasty O's – Mom's Best Naturals
 Honey & Oat Blenders – Malt-O-Meal
Honey Puffs
Honey Smacks – Kellogg's (formerly known as Sugar Smacks) (1953–present)
 Honey Toasted Kernza – Cascadian Farms, General Mills (2019)
Hostess – Post Cereals
Hot Wheels – Ralston (1990)
How to Train Your Dragon Adventure Crunch – MOM Brands (2015)
Hulk Cereal – Post (2003)
Disney Hunny B's Honey-Graham – Kellogg's/Disney (2002–2006)
 Hy-Vee Mahomes Magic Crunch – Hy-Vee (2019)
 Honey Stars – Nestlé
 Hershey's Kisses Cereal – General Mills (2020–present)

I
Ice Cream Cones – (1987) (limited edition availability in 2003)
Indiana Jones – Kellogg's – (2008–2009)
 Instant Hot Oat Cereal (Harvest Morn) – Aldi – see Ready Brek

J
Jurassic Park Crunch – General Mills (1997)
 Jets – General Mills (c. late 1950s to early 1970s)
Just Right – Kellogg's

K

Kaboom! – General Mills (1969–present: Limited Distribution)
Kashi- Indigo Morning, NON GMO, Organic
KamB8s Frosted Nuts-Organic (1996–present)
 Keebler Cereal – Kellogg's (2016)
Keebler Cookie Crunch Cereal – Kellogg's (2008–2010)
King Vitaman – Quaker Oats (1970–present)
Kix – General Mills (1937–present)
Berry Berry Kix – (1992–present)
 Honey Kix – (2009–present)
Koko Krunch – Nestlé – (Asia)
 Krave U.S Version – Kellogg's – (2012–present)
Chocolate Krave – (2012–present)
Cinnamon Crunch Krave – (2019)
Double Chocolate Krave – (2012–present)
S'mores Krave – (2014–present)
Strawberry Crunch Krave – (2019)
 Krispy Kritters (1960s–1980s) General Foods 
Krumbles-Kellogg's (1913–1973 [approx])
Krunchios (1989 [approx])
 Krusty-O's – fictional breakfast cereal, one of the many products produced from The Simpsons. This cereal was produced in limited quantities and sold at 7-Eleven convenience stores as a promotional item for The Simpsons Movie.
 Kung Fu Panda Crunchers cereal – Kellogg's / DreamWorks (2008)

L

La Lechera Flakes – Nestlé
La Lechera Churros
Life – Quaker (1960s–present)
Baked Apple Life – (2002)
Cinnamon Life – (1978–present)
Chocolate Oat Crunch Life – (2006–2008)
Gingerbread Spice Life
Honey Graham Life – (2004–2009)
Maple & Brown Sugar Life – (2008–present)
Pumpkin Spice Life
Raisin Life – (Mid 1980s)
Strawberry Life
Vanilla Life
Vanilla Yogurt Crunch Life – (2005 – July 2008)
 Liga Original
 Lion Cereal – Nestlé
 Little Einsteins Fruity Stars – General Mills
Lucky Charms – General Mills (1964–present)
 Berry Lucky Charms – (2006–2009)
 Chocolate Lucky Charms – (2005–present)
 Fruity Lucky Charms – (2019)

M

 Madagascar S'more Jungle Party – MOM Brands, Post Cereals (2015)
 Magic Puffs Cereal – General Mills (1970s)
 Major League Grand Slams – General Mills (1998)
 Mallow Oats – Mom's Best Cereals
 Malted Wheaties (Harvest Morn) – Aldi – see Shreddies
 Malt Wheats – Tesco – see Shreddies
 Maple & Brown Sugar Mini Spooners – Malt-O-Meal
Maple Waffle – Magic Spoon(2021)
Marshmallow Alpha-Bits – Post Cereals
 Marshmallow Mateys – Malt-O-Meal
Marshmallow-Blasted Froot Loops – Kellogg's (1998–2005)
Master Crunch – Master P 
Maximize – Bokomo
Mega Man – Funko
Mickey's Magix – Kellogg's/Disney (2002–2005)
Mickey Mouse Magic Crunch – Post (1988–1989)
 Mickey Mouse Clubhouse Berry Crunch – General Mills
Maypo
 Milo Cereal – Nestlé
 Milo Crunchy Bites – Nestlé
 Milo Duo – Nestlé
Mini Cinnamon Churros – Post Cereals (2011–present)
Mini Swirlz Cinnamon Bun Cereal – Kellogg's – (2005–2009)
Mini Swirlz Fudge Ripple Cereal – Kellogg's (2005–2007)
Mini Swirlz Peanut Butter Blast Cereal – Kellogg's (2006–2007)
Mini-Wheats – Kellogg's – (1978–present)
Minions – General Mills (2015)
Monopoly Cereal – General Mills (2003)
Monster Cereals – General Mills (1971–present / seasonal since 2010)
Boo Berry – General Mills (1973–present / seasonal since 2010)
Count Chocula – General Mills (1971–present / seasonal since 2010)
Franken Berry – General Mills (1971–present / seasonal since 2010)
Fruit Brute – General Mills (1974–1983) New Version (2013; renamed Frute Brute)
Fruity Yummy Mummy – General Mills (1988–1993) New Version (2013)
Monsters University Cereal – Kellogg's (2013)
Moonstones – Ralston (1970s)
Morning Funnies – Ralston (1988–1989)
Most
Mr. T Cereal – Quaker Oats (1984)
Mr. Wonderful's Surprize – General Mills (1970s)
Mud & Bugs – Kellogg's/Disney (2003–2006)
Muesli
 Gaia Muesli
 Harvest Morn Fruit Muesli – Aldi
 Harvest Morn Fruit & Nut Muesli – Aldi
 Kelkin Fruit & Nut Muesli
 Specially Selected Berries & Cherries Muesli – Aldi
 Specially Selected Really Nutty Muesli – Aldi
 Specially Selected Very Berry Muesli – Aldi
 Tesco No Added Sugar Or Salt Swiss Style Muesli
Mueslix – Kellogg's (1980s–present)
 Muffets – Quaker

N
Neopets Islandberry Crunch – General Mills (2006)
Nerds Cereal – Ralston (1985–1986)
Nescau Cereal – Nestlé (1996–present; only sold in Brazil)
Nescau Duo (2012–present)
Nestlé NesQuik – General Mills/Nestlé (1999–present)
Nickelodeon Green Slime Cereal – General Mills (2003)
Nintendo Cereal System – Ralston/Nintendo (1988–1989)
 Nut 'n Honey – Kellogg's
Nutri-Grain – Kellogg's
Nion-Nion – Achalandage
Nutter Butter – Post (2018)

O
 Oatbake – Kellogg's (early 1990s)
Oatmeal Crisp – General Mills (originally Oatmeal Raisin Crisp, now in multiple varieties)
 Oatmeal Squares – Quaker Oats (originally or previously Oat Squares, also Cinnamon version)
 Oat Bran Squares – Quaker Oats
Oatibix – Weetabix Limited (2006–present)
 Oat Crisp – Quaker Oats (late 1990s?–present) (replacement for Oat Krunchies)
 Oat Krunchies – Quaker Oats (1970s–late 1990s?) (replaced by Crisp then Oat Crisp)
 Oats & Honey Blend – Mom's Best Naturals
 Oh's – Quaker Oats Company (mid-1980s)
 "oho!" breakfast cereals (1991)
 O.J.s – Kellogg's (1980s)
 OKs – Kellogg's (early 1960s)
Oops! All Berries – Quaker Oats (1997–present) (sporadic availability)
 Optima Fruit & Fibre – see Fruit 'n Fibre
 Optivita – Kellogg's (Available in The UK)
Orange Blossom – General Mills (1981)
 Organic Wild Puffs – Barbara's Bakery
Oreo O's – Post Cereals (1998–2007) (Reintroduced 2018–Present)

P

Pac-Man – General Mills (early 1980s)
Palaseja – Lithuania (1994)
PAW Patrol – Kellogg's
PAW Patrol Vanilla Crunch – General Mills
Peanut Butter Crunch – Quaker Oats (1969–present)
Peanut Butter Puffs – Milville (2019)
Peanut Butter Toast Crunch – General Mills (2004–2005) (2013–present)
Pebbles Cereal – Post Cereals (1969–present)
Bamm-Bamm Berry Pebbles – Post (2007–2009)
Cinna-Crunch Pebbles – Post Cereals (1998–2001)
Cinnamon Pebbles – Post Cereals (2016–)
Cocoa Pebbles – Post Cereals (1970–present)
Cupcake Pebbles – Post Cereals (2009–2011)
Dino Pebbles – Post Cereals (early 1990s)
Dino S'mores Pebbles – Post Cereals (2008)
Fruity Pebbles – Post Cereals (1969–present)
IceBerry Pebbles – Post Cereals (2006–2007)
Limited Edition Smurfs Pebbles – Post Cereals (2011–)
Marshmallow Mania Pebbles – Post Cereals (2005–2007)
Marshmallow Pebbles – Post Cereals (2010–)
Pebbles Boulders – Post Cereals (2011–)
Poppin' Pebbles – Post Cereals (2014–)
Winter Fruity Pebbles – Post Cereals (2003)
Peeps (candy) – Kellogg's
Pep – Kellogg's
Pink Panther Flakes – Post Cereals (1972–1974)
Pirates of the Caribbean Cereal – Kellogg's (2006–2007)
Pokémon Cereal – Kellogg's (2000)
Pop-Tarts Crunch – Kellogg's (1995)
 Porridge
 Flahavan's Progress Oatlets
 Kavanagh's Porridge – Aldi
 Powdered Donutz – General Mills (early 1980s)
Product 19 – Kellogg's (1967–2016)
 Pro Grain Cereal – Kellogg's (1987–1988)
 Pro Stars (feat. Wayne Gretzky on the covers) – General Mills
 Prophet's Pastry Pops – Amber Franklin Cereal Products (2013–present)
 Pronutro – Bokomo, South Africa
 Puff – Kashi
Puffa Puffa Rice – Kellogg's (1967–1975)
 Puffed Rice – (Quaker Oats) (Malt-O-Meal)
 Puffed Wheat – (Quaker Oats) (Malt-O-Meal)
 Puffkins – UK (c.1960)
 Puffins – Barbara's Bakery (early 1990s)
Punch Crunch – (Quaker Oats) (1970s)

Q
Quake – Quaker Oats (1965–1970)
Quake Quangaroos – Quaker Oats (1971–1974)
 Quaker Crackels – Quaker Oats
 Quaker Oatmeal Squares – Quaker Oats
Quaker Oh's – Quaker Oats
Quisp – Quaker Oats (1965 – sold online and in limited distribution)
Quaking nuts in your mouth – Quaker Oats (1985 – sold online and in limited distribution)

R

Rainbow Brite Cereal – Ralston (1985)
Raisin Bran – Kellogg's (1944–present)
Raisin Bran Crunch – Kellogg's (1999–present)
Raisin Nut Bran – General Mills
 Raisin Squares – Kellogg's
Raisin Wheats – Kellogg's – (1980s -present)
Ready Brek – Weetabix Limited
Reese's Puffs – General Mills (May 1994-present)
Reptar Crunch – Post (1999)
Rice Bubbles
 Rice Honeys – Nabisco
Sugar Rice Krinkles – Post (1951–1970s)
Rice Krispies – Kellogg's – (1927–present)
Crispy Rice – Malt-O-Meal
Harvest Morn Crisp Rice – Aldi
Apple Cinnamon Rice Krispies – Kellogg's (1980s–1990s)
Berry Krispies – Kellogg's (2006–2008)
Cocoa Krispies – Kellogg's (1958–present)
Cocoa Krispies Choconilla – Kellogg's (2007–2009)
Frosted Krispies – Kellogg's (known as Ricicles in the United Kingdom)
Fruity Marshmallow Krispies – Kellogg's (1987-late 1990s)
Honey Rice Krispies – Kellogg's – (1996–present) (available only in The UK)
Jumbo Krispies – Kellogg's (2009–2011)
Marshmallow Rice Krispies – Kellogg's (1982–1993)
Razzle Dazzle Rice Krispies – Kellogg's (1997–2000)
Rice Krispies With Real Strawberries – Kellogg's (2007–2009)
Rice Krispies Treats Cereal – Kellogg's (March 1993–present)
Rice Krispies with Vanilla Flavour – Kellogg's (available only in Canada)
Strawberry Rice Krispies – Kellogg's (Limited time in 1983 and 1997) (Permanent in 2019)
 Richard Petty 43's – General Mills
Rip's Big Bowl – Engine 2 Diet
 Rocky Mountain Chocolate Cereal – Kellogg's (2013)
 Rocky Road – General Mills (1986–1987)
 Ryan's World Cereal – Kellogg's (2019)
Rail Road tracks – Joey Mickladlen (1986)

S

 Scooby-Doo! – Kellogg's (2013)
 Sesame Street Cereal – Post Cereals/General Mills (2013–present)
 Shopkins Cutie O’s cereal – Kellogg’s (2019)
 Shredded Oats – Barbara's Bakery, 1980s
 Shreddd Spoonfuls – Barbara's Bakery, 1980s
 Shredded Wheat
Nestlé
Post Cereals (originally Nabisco Shredded Wheat) Barbara's Bakery (US), Cereal Partners (UK) – (variants and generic versions sold under various names)
Shreddies
Nestlé
Post Foods
Shrek's (NOT Donkey's) – Shrek-themed cereal made by General Mills
Shrek 2 Mud & Worms – Nestlé (2004)
Shrek Cereal – Kellogg's (2007)
Shrek Ogre O's – MOM Brands (2015)
 Sir Grapefellow – General Mills (1972)
Slimer! And The Real Ghostbusters Cereal – Ralston (early 1990s)
 Smart Bran
Smart Start
S'mores Grahams or S'mores Crunch – General Mills (1980s–1990s)
Smorz – Kellogg's (2003–present)
Smurf Berry Crunch – Post Cereals (1983)
Smurf Magic Berries – Post Cereals (1987–early 1990s)
 Snow Flakes – Nestlé (Eastern Europe, Asia and South America)
Sonic the Hedgehog – Funko
Sour Patch Kids – Post Cereals
Special K – Kellogg's (1955–present)
Chocolatey Delight – Kellogg's
Cinnamon Pecan – Kellogg's
Blueberry – Kellogg's
Red Berries – Kellogg's (2001–present)
Vanilla Almond – Kellogg's
Fruit and Yogurt – Kellogg's
Protein Plus – Kellogg's
Spider-Man – Ralston (1995)
Spider-Man Cereal – Kellogg's (2002) (2004)
Spider-Man 3 Cereal – General Mills (2007)
SpongeBob SquarePants – Kellogg's (2004–2007)
SpongeBob SquarePants – General Mills (2014)
SpongeBob SquarePants Cereal – Kellogg's (2020)
Sour Patch Kids – Post Cereals (2019)
Sprinkle Spangles – General Mills (early 1990s)
 Stars – Kellogg's (1960s)
Star Wars cereal – Kellogg's (c.2005)
Start – Kellogg's
Strawberry Blasted Honeycomb – Post Cereals
Strawberry Squares – Kellogg's (1980s)
Strawberry Shortcake – General Mills (1980s)
 Strawberry Smiggles – FYE (2018)
Sugar Crisp – Post Cereals – (now known as Golden Crisp) (1949–present)
 Sugar Jets – General Mills – (name later shortened to Jets) (1950s)
Sugar Puffs – (now known as Honey Monster Puffs)
Sugar Smacks – Kellogg's – (now known as Honey Smacks) (1953–present)
 Sugar Sprinkled Twinkles – General Mills (1960–1965)
 Sugar Stars – Kellogg's (1958–1966?)
Sultana Bran – Kellogg's (Australia and New Zealand)
 Sun Crunchers – General Mills (discontinued) (1990s)
 Sun Flakes – Ralston (discontinued)
Superman Stars – Post Cereals
Super Mario Cereal – Kellogg's
 Sweetened Wheat-fuls – Mom's Best Naturals
 S.W. Graham – Kellogg's (1980s)

T
 Team Flakes – Nabisco
Teddy Grahams Breakfast Bears Graham Cereal – Nabisco (1990)
Teenage Mutant Ninja Turtles – Ralston (1989–1991)
 Temptations French Vanilla Cereal – Kellogg's (1995)
 Temptations Honey Roasted Pecan Cereal – Kellogg's (1995)
 Tesco High Fibre Bran – see All-Bran
 Three Wishes
Tiger Power – Kellogg's (2004–2006)
 Tim Hortons Timbits Cereal – Post Cereals – (2020)
 Tiny Toon Adventures Cereal – Quaker (1990)
 Toasted Cinnamon Squares – Mom's Best Naturals
 Toasted Wheat-fuls – Mom's Best Naturals
Toasties – Post Cereals
Tony's Cinnamon Krunchers – Kellogg's (2003–2005)
Tony's Turboz – Kellogg's (2005–present)
Total – General Mills (1961–present)
Total Cinnamon Crunch
Total Corn
Total Cranberry Crunch
Total Honey Clusters
Total Raisin Bran
Triple Snack – Kellogg's (ca 1965–1967)
Triples – General Mills (1993)
Trix – General Mills (1954–present)
 Mini Trix – (2015)
Trix Swirls – (2009)
Trolls World Tour Trix – General Mills (2019)
Turbo Cereal – Post Cereals (2014)
 Twinkles – General Mills (1960s)
 Thin Mint – Girl Scouts (2017)

U
 Ultima Organic Cereals – Barbara's Bakery
Uncle Sam Cereal – U.S. Mills (1908–present)
Undercover Bears – General Mills (1990–1991)
Urkel-Os – Ralston (1991–1992)

V
 Vanilly Crunch – Quaker Oats (1970s)
Vector – Kellogg's (only sold in Canada)
Veggie O's (popular cereal in Yemen)
 Vita Brits – Uncle Tobys – (1970s–present; only sold in Australia)
 Vive – Kellogg's – (2001–present)
Vanilla Life – (Quaker Oats)
8 AM Corn Flakes – VRI.

W-Z

 Wackies – General Mills (1965–1967)
 Waffelos – Ralston (late 1970s–early 1980s)
Waffle Crisp – Post Cereals (1996–present) (sporadic availability)
Weet-Bix – Sanitarium Health Food Company
Weetabix – Weetabix Limited – (generic equivalent branded as "whole-wheat biscuits" or similar) – Post Cereals
Weetabix Minis – Weetabix Limited
Weetos – Weetabix Limited
 Wheat Biscuits – Tesco – see Weetabix
 Wheat Bisks (Harvest Morn) – Aldi – see Weetabix
 Wheat Honeys Nabisco
Wheatena
Wheaties – General Mills – "The Breakfast of Champions" (1924–present)
Wheaties Dunk-A-Balls – General Mills (1993)
Wheaties Quarterback Crunch – General Mills (1994)
 Wheat Shreds (Harvest Morn) – Aldi – see Shredded Wheat
Wild Animal Crunch – Kellogg's (2008–2009)
 X-treme Fiber N' Berries
 Yog-Active
Zany Fruits –{no} Western Family

See also

 Breakfast cereal
 List of breakfast cereal advertising characters
 List of breakfast foods
 List of breakfast topics

References

Lists of brand name foods